= B-mode =

B-mode may refer to:

- B-mode (brightness mode) image, a two-dimensional ultrasound image and the most common type
- B-modes, a pattern of polarized light originating from the Big Bang possessing a "handedness" to the pattern of polarization due to gravitational wave's anisotropic stretching of space - and unlike E-mode polarization pattern which is highly symmetrical
